Robert Walpole (3 May 1736 – 19 April 1810), from 1756 styled The Hon. Robert Walpole, was the fourth son of the 1st Baron Walpole, the younger brother of Robert Walpole, the Prime Minister.  He served as an extra clerk of the Privy Council from 1749 until 1764, when he replaced Henry Fane as one of the Clerks in Ordinary. After serving as secretary of the British embassy in Paris, he was envoy extraordinary and minister plenipotentiary to Portugal from 1771 to 1800. One of his sons was Major-General George Walpole (1758–1835), under-secretary for foreign affairs in 1806.

Walpole was married twice: first, on 8 May 1780, to Diana Grosset (died 24 July 1784); and second, on 10 May 1785, to Sophia Stert (died 12 June 1829). He had issue by both wives; Robert Walpole the classical scholar was a son of the first marriage.

Notes

 

1736 births
1810 deaths
Younger sons of barons
Clerks of the Privy Council
Robert
Ambassadors of Great Britain to Portugal